Yo no elegí mi vida is a 1949 Argentine film.

Cast
 Arturo de Córdova		
 Olga Zubarry		
 Enrique Santos Discépolo		
 Guillermo Battaglia		
 Alberto Bello		
 Eloy Álvarez		
 Juan Corona		
 Homero Cárpena		
 Bertha Moss		
 Joaquín Petrocino		
 Iris Portillo		
 Marcos Zucker		
 Maruja Pais		
 José Comellas		
 Raúl Luar

External links
 

1949 films
Films directed by Antonio Momplet
1940s Spanish-language films
Argentine black-and-white films
Argentine drama films
1949 drama films
1940s Argentine films